Henry Broadwood (8 August 1795 or 1793 – 1878) was a British Conservative politician.

He was a younger son of John Broadwood (by his second wife) and came from the famous piano-making family who owned John Broadwood & Sons, and supplied Beethoven with his favourite piano. He studied at Emmanuel College, Cambridge from 1813.   He became a Gentleman of the Privy Chamber to King George IV in 1826, continuing under William IV after 1830.

After unsuccessfully contesting the 1835 general election for Bridgwater, Broadwood became Conservative Member of Parliament (MP) for the same seat at a by-election in 1837—caused by the resignation of John Temple Leader. He then held the seat until 1852 when he did not seek re-election.

On 19 May 1840 he married Fanny Lowther (1818-1890) at Saint Martin in the Fields, a few hundred yards from the homes of both.  She was the "natural" (illegitimate) daughter of the unmarried Viscount Lowther, the future William Lowther, 2nd Earl of Lonsdale, also a Tory MP, who had been a friend of George IV.  By a later liaison of her mother with Dr Charles Lewis Meryon, Fanny Lowther was the half-sister of the French artist Charles Meryon who she helped support to the end of his life.  She was living with her father at 15 Carlton House Terrace at her marriage, and received a dowry of £10,000.  After Lowther's death in 1872 Fanny was left £125,000.

They had two sons and a daughter, Mary, who died young (1851–66).  The elder son was Arthur Broadwood (1849-1927), who retired from the army as a colonel in 1906, a year after being made Companion of the Royal Victorian Order.   He had five children.  His brother was Alfred Broadwood (1856-1909), who also had children.

Broadwood had been left £20,000 and a country house in Essex at his father's death in 1812. Most of this was invested by his trustees in a partnership in a Lion Brewery in London (apparently not the Lion Brewery Co in Lambeth).  But the business, perhaps neglected by Broadwood, was not a success, and in 1848 his "fortune collapsed", and for the rest of his life he lived in Tunbridge Wells, though remaining an MP until 1852.

Notes

References
Collins, Roger, Charles Meryon: A Life, 1999, Garton & Company, 9780906030356

External links
 

UK MPs 1835–1837
UK MPs 1837–1841
UK MPs 1841–1847
UK MPs 1847–1852
Conservative Party (UK) MPs for English constituencies
1795 births
1878 deaths
Gentlemen of the Privy Chamber